Life' is the soundtrack to the 1999 film, Life''. It was released on March 16, 1999 through Rock Land/Interscope Records and was almost entirely produced by R&B singer R. Kelly, with Wyclef Jean and Jerry Duplessis producing four tracks on the album. The soundtrack was a huge success, making it to No. 10 on the Billboard 200 and No. 2 on the Top R&B/Hip-Hop Albums. It spawned the hit single "Fortunate" by Maxwell, which peaked at No. 4 on the Billboard Hot 100. The soundtrack was certified platinum on June 18, 1999, while "Fortunate" was certified gold on June 2 that same year. "What Would You Do?", by City High, would go on to chart in 2001.  A version of the classic Harold Melvin & the Blue Notes song "Wake Up Everybody" plays during the film's opening credits.

Charts and certifications

Weekly charts

Year-end charts

Certifications

Track listing
"25 to Life"- 4:03 (Xzibit, Ja Rule, Juvenile, Nature & Reptile) 
"It's Like Everyday"- 4:26 (DJ Quik featuring R. Kelly and Maus Berg) 
"Stimulate Me"- 4:13 (Destiny's Child featuring Mocha) 
"Fortunate"- 4:59 (Maxwell)  
"Lovin' You" (The Remix)- 3:57 (Sparkle)  
"Every Which Way"- 4:05 (Talent featuring Vegas Cats)  
"It's Gonna Rain"- 4:02 (Kelly Price) 
"Discovery"- 4:19 (Brian McKnight)
"Follow the Wind"- 4:28 (Trisha Yearwood)  
"Why Should I Believe You?"- 4:09 (Mýa) 
"What Would You Do?"- 3:32 (City High) 
"What Goes Around"- 4:27 (Khadejia featuring Marie Antoinette)  
"Speechless"- 4:52 (The Isley Brothers)
"Life"- 3:43 (K-Ci & JoJo)
"New Day"- 3:59 (Wyclef Jean featuring Kenny G)

References

1999 soundtrack albums
Albums produced by G-One
Albums produced by R. Kelly
Comedy-drama film soundtracks
Hip hop soundtracks
Interscope Records soundtracks
Rhythm and blues soundtracks